Edge Hill, also known as Edgehill and Edgehill Farm, is a historic house located near Shadwell in Albemarle County, Virginia, United States.

Early history
William Randolph of Tuckahoe acquired 2400 acres as a land grant from King George II in 1735, and it was inherited by his son Thomas Mann Randolph, Sr. of Tuckahoe. In 1790, he gave it and his Varina plantation near Richmond to his son Thomas Mann Randolph, Jr. as a wedding gift when the younger Randolph marries Martha Jefferson, daughter of Virginia governor and U.S. President Thomas Jefferson.

The younger Randolphs came to prefer the cooler mountain air of Albemarle County, so they built a one-story, wood-frame structure on the property about 1799, but they preferred living at Monticello. Randolph Jr. acted as an overseer at Jefferson's plantation as well as ran this one, but also ran up and inherited great debt. The current two-story, brick main house dates from 1828, and was rebuilt in 1916, after a fire gutted the interior. Thomas Jefferson Randolph, one of Randolph Jr.'s sons who became Thomas Jefferson's favorite grandson and beneficiary of his papers as well as executor of his estate, acquired his debt-ridden father's estate (house, land and slaves) at an auction on January 2, 1826. About two years later, he hired William B. Phillips and Malcolm F. Crawford (local master mason and master carpenter, respectively) to built this house in the style of Monticello (which often can be viewed from it), the University of Virginia and other historic Charlottesville properties.

Edge Hill School for Girls
That original Edgehill structure remains on the property, having been rolled to the hilltop and used as a private academy run by Jane Hollins Nicholas Randolph beginning in 1829 until about 1850 and as an academy for young ladies from 1867 until 1900, as well as used an office.

Later years
The property passed out of the Randolph family in 1902, following the death of Carolina Ramsay Randolph. It was added to the National Register of Historic Places in 1982.

References

External links
Journey through Hallowed Ground: Edgehill

Jefferson family residences
Randolph family residences
Houses in Albemarle County, Virginia
Plantation houses in Virginia
Presidential homes in the United States
Greek Revival houses in Virginia
Federal architecture in Virginia
Houses completed in 1821
Houses on the National Register of Historic Places in Virginia
National Register of Historic Places in Albemarle County, Virginia
Rebuilt buildings and structures in Virginia